Clodoaldo Caldeira (born 1 December 1899, date of death unknown), known as Clodô, was a Brazilian footballer. He played in four matches for the Brazil national football team from 1922 to 1925. He was also part of Brazil's squad for the 1925 South American Championship.

References

External links
 
 

1899 births
Year of death missing
Brazilian footballers
Brazil international footballers
Footballers from São Paulo (state)
Association football defenders
São Paulo FC players
Brazilian football managers
São Paulo FC managers
Brazil national football team managers
People from Botucatu